"The Letter That Johnny Walker Read" is a song written and recorded by the American country music band Asleep at the Wheel. It was released in August 1975 as the lead single from their album Texas Gold. The song's title is a reference to  the Johnnie Walker "Red Label" Scotch whiskey. It was their highest-charting single, reaching number 10 on the Hot Country Singles charts in 1975. It was featured on the country radio station K-Rose in the 2004 cross-platform video game Grand Theft Auto: San Andreas. The band re-recorded the song with Lee Ann Womack for their 2021 album Half a Hundred Years.

Chart performance

References

Songs about fictional male characters
Songs about letters (message)
1975 singles
Asleep at the Wheel songs
1975 songs